The large moth subfamily Lymantriinae contains the following genera beginning with T:

References 

Lymantriinae
Lymantriid genera T